"Driving the Last Spike" is the third track on the Genesis album We Can't Dance, released in 1991.

The song's lyrics by Phil Collins are about the Navvies:railway workers of the 19th century, many of whom died constructing Britain's railways. The song narrates the thoughts and feelings of an unnamed railway worker in the form of a soliloquy or internal monologue. The title is a phrase meaning the completion of a major railway project—placing the "last spike" is often a momentous occasion. The original idea came from a book that actor Dennis Waterman gave to Collins.

Despite not being released as a single, "Driving the Last Spike" charted in Canada and the United States, peaking at number 51 on the Canadian RPM Top Singles chart and number 25 on the US Billboard Album Rock Tracks chart.

Personnel 
 Tony Banks – keyboards
 Phil Collins – vocals, drums, drum machine 
 Mike Rutherford – electric guitars, bass guitar

Live performances
"Driving the Last Spike" was performed live only on the band's 1992 The Way We Walk Tour. The second half of the song (starting at 5:41) 
was transposed to a lower key starting after the first nine shows of the tour. This was done to accommodate Collins' deepening voice without straining. (A recording of an early performance of "Driving the Last Spike" was released as an Atlantic Records promo CD featuring the second half of the song in the album key.)

"Driving the Last Spike" was featured on the live album The Way We Walk, Volume Two: The Longs, and the live DVD The Way We Walk - Live in Concert.

Charts

See also
List of train songs

References

Genesis (band) songs
1991 songs
Songs written by Tony Banks (musician)
Songs written by Phil Collins
Songs written by Mike Rutherford
Rock ballads
Songs about labor